Timothy or Tim Andrews may refer to:

Tim Andrews (born 1983), NASCAR driver
Tim Andrews (potter) (born 1960), English studio potter
Timothy Andrews (general) (1794–1868), Irish-born, U.S. Army officer
Timothy Andrews (cricketer) in 2011 ICC European T20 Championship Division Two
Tim Andrews (born 1956), American businessman, president of the Tennessee Valley Railroad Museum

See also
Tim Andrew, director